Yamba Malick Sawadogo is a Burkinabé politician and former prisoner. Sawadogo represented Burkina Faso in the Pan-African Parliament and, in 1987, while serving jail time at the Ouagadougou Arrest and Correction House, was involved in the burial of assassinated president Thomas Sankara.

References

Living people
Year of birth missing (living people)
Members of the Pan-African Parliament from Burkina Faso